The discography of Whodini consists of six studio albums and twenty-seven singles.

Albums

Studio albums

Compilation albums
 Greatest Hits (1990)
 Funky Beat: The Best of Whodini (2006)

Singles

Featured singles

Soundtracks

Notes

References

External links
 

Hip hop discographies
Discographies of American artists